The Prix Paul-Émile-Borduas is an award by the Government of Quebec that is part of the Prix du Québec, given to individuals who are artists or craftsman in the fields of visual arts, of the trades of art, architecture and the design. It is named in honour of Paul-Émile Borduas.

The disciplines recognized for this prize in the field of visual arts are painting, sculpture, print, drawing, illustration, photography, textile arts, video art and multidisciplinary arts.

The disciplines recognized in the field of the trades of art are those which refer to the transformation wood, leather, textiles, metals, silicates or of any other matter.

Winners

References

References

Canadian art awards
Prix du Québec